Puli ( Tiger) is a 1985 Telugu-language action film, produced by Anam Gopala Krishna Reddy under the Sri Venkata Krishna Films banner and directed by Raj Bharat. It stars Chiranjeevi and Radha , with music composed by Chakravarthy. The film was a flop at the box office.

Plot
Kranthi (Chiranjeevi) is an honest police officer who is deputed to the special branch. He has a sister named Lakshmi. Inspector Shyam is a corrupt officer and works for Smuggler JK. One day, Shyam causes an accident and as a result of which Lakshmi loses her eyesight and her fiancée gets murdered. Kranthi goes on the hunt and catches corrupt inspector Shyam and his associate James. Meanwhile, JK Kidnaps Radha and Lakshmi. The rest of the movie is about how all ends well.

Cast
Chiranjeevi as Kranthi
Radha as Radha
Rao Gopal Rao as J.K.
Satyanarayana as Pratap Rao
Allu Ramalingaiah as Narasimham
Rajendra Prasad as Inspector Prasad
Nutan Prasad as Inspector Shyam
Subhalekha Sudhakar as Gopi
Sudarshan as Jaggu
Annapurna as Savitri
Samyuktha as Lakshmi
Silk Smitha as item number

Soundtrack

Music composed by Chakravarthy. Lyrics were written by Veturi. Music released on AVM Audio Company.

Other
 VCDs and DVDs on - SHALIMAR Video Company, Hyderabad

References

Indian action films
Films scored by K. Chakravarthy
1980s Telugu-language films
1985 action films
1985 films